Cristiana Barbosa da Silva de Oliveira  (born December 15, 1963, in Rio de Janeiro) is a Brazilian actress, model and businesswoman.

Biography

The daughter of Oscar de Oliveira and Eugênia Barbosa da Silva de Oliveira, Cristiana Oliveira is the youngest of a family of nine children with two brothers and seven sisters. Oliveira was born and raised in a house in Ipanema, Brazil. To help at home she began to work at a flower shop near her residence at ten years of age. Her nickname, since she was a young child,  was Krika.

Career
After recording a commercial directed by Walter Salles, she was called by Jayme Monjardim, to audition for TV Manchete for Shock a program broadcasting music clips. She auditioned for the leading role of Dora for the telenovela Kananga do Japão. She was cast as Hannah after actress Bia Seidl quit the role. Associação Paulista de Críticos de Arte (APCA) recognized Oliveira's performance in that show.

In 1989, she began recording the Pantanal for Rede Manchete. After reading the synopsis, Oliveira fell in love with the character of Juma, a role initially intended for actress Glória Pires, and offered to play her. The telenovela was a big hit, winning a large audience for Rede Manchete and becoming a landmark in Brazilian soap operas. Her work won awards in Brazil and abroad. It was one of her most recognized and idolized roles.

In 1992, she was hired by TV Globo as the protagonist for the miniseries Agosto, a role that ultimately came to be played by Vera Fischer. Instead, Oliviera won the part of the protagonist, along with Tarcísio Meira, for the telenovela De Corpo e Alma. In February of that year, she posed nude for the Brazilian edition of Playboy magazine.

In 1994, she took part in the miniseries Memorial de Maria Moura, and then starred in the soap opera Quatro por Quatro, alongside actresses Letícia Spiller, Elizabeth Savalla and Betty Lago. It was her first comic role as a television actress. After the end of the telenovela, she lived in New York City in order to improve her English.

In 2001, she appeared in the first episode of the soap opera Porto dos Milagres. The following year she was in the second season of the telenovela O Clone, in which she was disguised as the villain Alicinha.

In 2011, she had a cameo role as lesbian and convicted drug dealer named Araci Laranjeira in Insensato Coração. Her performance was praised by viewers and critics alike. She had to gain 15 pounds to play the role and was a victim of prejudice from some of the media and the public. 
In 2012, she played Yolanda in Salve Jorge. In 2014, she returns to TV in the GNT series, Animal, in the role of former delegate and mayor Mariana Gomes. In 2015, it signs contract with Rede Record to integrate the cast of the novel A Terra Prometida.

In 2018, Cristiana returns to the cinema after eleven years since the last film in which she participated, Nossa Senhora de Caravaggio. She is in the cast of Eu sou Brasileiro, by Alessandro Barros; Borderline, by Cibele Amaral; Paixão Nacional, by Teresa Jessouron, and in Uma Carta para Ferdinand, by Anderson and Kleber Dresch.

In 2019, after three years away from television, she will return to soap operas on Topíssima, RecordTV's telenovela, playing Lara, a social climber.

Personal life 
At age 13, in 1976, she became addicted to cigarettes, only succeeding in getting rid of dependency in 1998, with the help of Victor Fasano, her friend by profession.

Cristiana was married to photographer André Wanderley, from this union was born Rafaella. In 1994, Cristiana married for the second time, this time with the businessman Marcos Sampaio, with whom she was married for 8 years. In 1999, her second daughter, Antônia, was born.

On February 7, 2013, became grandmother for the first time, with the birth of Miguel, son of Rafaella.

Filmography

Television

Film

References

External links

1963 births
Living people
Actresses from Rio de Janeiro (city)
Brazilian television actresses
Brazilian telenovela actresses
Brazilian film actresses
Brazilian stage actresses